William Burr Hopkins (January 1, 1869 – December 6, 1935) was the head coach of the University of Maine's football team in 1899 and compiled a 2–3 record.

Hopkins was born in 1869 to Burton and Anna (née Sprague) Hopkins. He was captain of the Brown University football teams of 1893 and 1894. After Brown, he worked as an engineer in Pennsylvania before serving overseas in France for World War I.  After his return, he married Fanny Schinsing in 1921 and worked as a farmer until his death in 1935 after a horse accident.

Head coaching record

References

1869 births
1935 deaths
19th-century players of American football
Brown Bears football players
Maine Black Bears football coaches
People from Ontario, New York
People from Marion, New York
Coaches of American football from New York (state)
Players of American football from New York (state)
Accidental deaths in New York (state)
Deaths by horse-riding accident in the United States